Pentanema salicinum (common name Irish fleabane (UK) or willowleaf yellowhead) is a plant species in the family Asteraceae. It is found across Eurasia from Portugal to Japan. It has been reported growing in the wild in a few scattered locations in North America but it has not become widely established there.

Taxonomy

Pentanema salicinum was first described by Carl Linnaeus in 1753. It is known from a variety of common names including willowleaf yellowhead, Irish fleabane and willow-leaved Inula. Since its initial description it has also been ascribed a variety of Latin names, all of which are now regarded as synonyms and probably reflecting the still uncertain taxonomy of the genus, it being regarded as possibly paraphyletic.

Distribution
Pentanema salicinum is to be found extensively across mainland western Europe, from Spain through France, Benelux, Germany, Poland, Denmark and southern Scandinavia. It only has a very restricted distribution is the British Isles, being confined to a small area of south central Ireland, around Lough Derg in north Tipperary and south-east Galway. Indeed, it is now reported that it can only be found at a single locality, having been eliminated from former sites through human activity.  The species has become a flagship species and a focus for conservation efforts, with a co-ordinated program to reintroduce the plant already well underway. The plant is regarded a member of the Lusitanian flora in that it is a member of a group of plants that are specific to south west Ireland, are not found in the rest of the British Isles and are plants that are more normally seen in the Mediterranean. It is not known how this group of plants became established in Ireland, but it is likely to have been in the last 10,000 years since the end of the last ice age.

Description
Pentanema salicinum is an upright herb,  in height, with a thin stem, narrow, elongate, alternate, stemless leaves, which with the stem are roughly haired. Each head contains 35-70 yellow ray flowers containing 100-250 yellow disc flowers.

References

External links

photo of herbarium specimen at Missouri Botanical Garden

salicinum
Plants described in 1753
Taxa named by Carl Linnaeus
Flora of Asia
Flora of Europe